The GLAAD Media Award for Outstanding Limited or Anthology Series is one of the annual GLAAD Media Awards which is offered to the best LGBT-related television limited series or movie. From 1990 to 2019, the category was known as the GLAAD Media Award for Outstanding TV Movie or Limited Series. At the 31st GLAAD Media Awards, the award was split and honored both a limited series and a TV movie. At the 34th GLAAD Media Awards, the category received its current name, with TV movies instead being honored in the Outstanding Film - Streaming or TV category.

Winners and nominations

1990s

2000s

Television Movie, Mini-Series or Anthology

2010s

2020s

Notes

References

External links

TV Movie or Limited Series